The 1985 Rothmans Sharjah Cup was held in Sharjah, UAE, between November 15–22, 1985. Three national teams took part: India, Pakistan and West Indies.

The 1985 Rothmans Sharjah Cup was a round-robin tournament where each team played the other once. West Indies won both its matches, winning the Rothmans Cup and US$50,000. Pakistan came second while India lost both its matches. Player of the Series Richie Richardson won US$3,000 and a car.

Matches

Table

See also
 Sharjah Cup

References

 
 Cricket Archive: Rothmans Sharjah Cup 1985/86
 ESPNCricinfo: Rothmans Sharjah Cup, 1985/86
 Wisden Cricketers’ Almanack 1987: Sharjah Challenge Cup, 1985-86

International cricket competitions from 1985–86 to 1988
Rothmans Sharjah Cup, 1985
1985 in Emirati sport
International cricket competitions in the United Arab Emirates